Jake Stone is the name of:

Jake Stone (singer), member of Bluejuice
Jake Stone, State Farm employee
Jake Stone (EastEnders), fictional character